

Buildings and structures

Buildings
 447–432 BC – Modern Parthenon in Athens built by Ictinus and Callicrates under the direction of the sculptor Phidias.
 About 430 BC – Temple of Apollo Epicurius at Bassae, in Arcadia constructed.

References

Architecture